, born , was the eleventh child and seventh daughter of Emperor Meiji of Japan, and the fourth child and third daughter of Sono Sachiko, the Emperor's fifth concubine.

Biography

Fusako was born in Tokyo, the daughter of Emperor Meiji and Lady Sachiko. Fusako held the childhood appellation "Kane no miya" (Princess Kane).

On 29 April 1909, Princess Kane married Prince Kitashirakawa (1887–1923), the son of Prince Kitashirakawa Yoshihisa and Princess Tomiko. Prince Naruhisa succeeded as head of the house of Kitashirakawa-no-miya after the death of his father in November 1895 during the First Sino-Japanese War. Prince and Princess Kitashirakawa had one son and three daughters:
 
 ; married Viscount Tachibana Tanekatsu
 ; married Viscount Higashizono Motofumi
 ; married Tokugawa Yoshihisa.

In October 1947, the Kitashirakawa and the other branches of the Japanese Imperial Family were divested of their titles and privileges during the American occupation of Japan and became commoners. The former princess served as custodian and chief priestess of the Ise Shrine until her death on 11 August 1974, aged 84.

Ancestry

References 

1890 births
1974 deaths
Japanese princesses
Grand Cordons (Imperial Family) of the Order of the Precious Crown
19th-century Japanese people
19th-century Japanese women
20th-century Japanese people
20th-century Japanese women
People from Tokyo
Japanese priestesses